Pinmonkey was an American country music group formed in 2002 by Michael Reynolds (lead vocals), brothers Michael Jeffers (vocals, bass guitar) and Chad Jeffers (Dobro, lap steel guitar), and Rick Schell (drums, vocals). Their first album, Speak No Evil, was released independently in 2002. Later that same year, they signed to BNA Records and released their self-titled album. It produced the singles "Barbed Wire and Roses" and "I Drove All Night", both of which charted on the Billboard Hot Country Singles & Tracks (now Hot Country Songs) charts. Schell departed, with Mike Crouch taking his place as drummer; Chad Jeffers also left to join Keith Urban's road band. Reduced to a trio composed of Mike Crouch, Michael Jeffers, and Michael Reynolds, Pinmonkey released their third album (titled Big Shiny Cars) on the independent Back Porch label in 2006 before disbanding.

Biography
Pinmonkey was founded by Michael Reynolds, Rick Schell, and brothers Michael and Chad Jeffers. The Jeffers brothers are natives of Kingsport, Tennessee, and had played in a band called the Habaneros, which was based out of Murfreesboro, in the 1990s. Chad attended Belmont University and after graduating in 1994, he worked in the mail room of Starstruck Studios, a recording studio owned by Reba McEntire, in addition to touring with The Wilkinsons. Rick Schell, a native of Homer, New York, had moved to Nashville, Tennessee in 1993 and had been hired to play on Steve Earle's I Feel Alright album, leading to him also playing for Joy Lynn White, Buddy Miller, and Elizabeth Cook. Michael Reynolds had moved to Nashville after graduating high school, and was working at a McDonald's restaurant when he befriended Chad Jeffers. This led to the formation of Pinmonkey, and all four began performing at the Sutler, a club in Nashville.

The four musicians derived their band name Pinmonkey from "And Maggie Makes Three", an episode of the cartoon The Simpsons. Record executive Joe Galante heard the band perform at the Sutler, and signed them to BNA Records in 2002. Galante also allowed the band to release an independent album called Speak No Evil, produced by Chad Jeffers and Schell, which they had completed just prior to signing. It received a positive review in Billboard, which compared the band favorably to Pure Prairie League and Poco, while also praising Reynolds' lead vocals and the musicianship.

In 2002, BNA released the band's debut single "Barbed Wire and Roses". Co-written by Tia Sillers, Mark Selby, and Sean Locke, the song peaked at number 25 on the Billboard Hot Country Singles & Tracks (now Hot Country Songs) charts. It served as the lead-off single to their self-titled album, released in late 2002. This album's second and final single was a cover of Cyndi Lauper's 1989 hit "I Drove All Night". Pinmonkey's version of the song made number 36 on the country chart in early 2003. Also in 2003, Pinmonkey began to tour with Lee Ann Womack and Brad Paisley in support of their album.

A third single, a cover of Robbie Fulks' "Let's Kill Saturday Night", peaked at number 44 on Hot Country Singles & Tracks in 2004. However, the single's promotion stopped when Schell abruptly quit the band, and BNA dropped them as a result. Mike Crouch took over as drummer, while Chad Jeffers left to join Keith Urban's road band. The three remaining members — Crouch, Reynolds, and Michael Jeffers — were signed to a recording contract with Back Porch Records, with the album Big Shiny Cars being released a year later. This album produced one single in "That Train Don't Run", originally released by Matraca Berg. The album included a song written by Kieran Kane, and another which featured Rusty Young and Elizabeth Cook on backing vocals. Jeffrey B. Remz of Country Standard Time reviewed the album positively, praising the country rock sound and Reynolds' singing voice.

Discography

Studio albums

Singles

Music videos

References

Country music groups from Tennessee
Musical groups from Nashville, Tennessee
Musical quartets
BNA Records artists
Musical groups established in 2002
Musical groups disestablished in 2006